Helen Hearnden (born 25 November 1954) is an Irish former cricketer. She played three Women's One Day International matches for Ireland women's cricket team. She was part of Ireland's squad for the 1988 Women's Cricket World Cup.

References

External links
 

1954 births
Living people
Irish women cricketers
Ireland women One Day International cricketers
People from Mullingar